The Women's World Chess Championship 2006 took place from March 10–27, 2006 in Ekaterinburg, Russia. For the fourth time, the championship took the form of a 64-player knock-out tournament.

The tournament was won by Xu Yuhua, who beat Alisa Galliamova in the final by 2½ to ½. Notably, Xu Yuhua was three months pregnant at the time.

Participants
The players were seeded by their FIDE Elo ratings of January 2006, except that defending champion Antoaneta Stefanova was the no. 1 seed.

Only two players from the top 20 were absent: Judit Polgár (ranked the no. 1 woman in the world – and 14th overall) who instead took part in the open championship events of 2005 and 2007, as well as Hoang Thanh Trang (ranked 11th).

Qualification paths 

WC: Women's World Champion, runner-up and semifinalists of Women's World Chess Championship 2004 (4)
J04 and J05: World Junior Champions 2004 and 2005
R: Rating (average of all published ratings from July 2004 to January 2005 was used) (5)
E04 and E05: European Individual Championships 2004 and 2005 (29)

AM: American Continental Chess Championship 2005 (3)
AS: Asian Chess Championship 2004 (3)
AF: African Chess Championship 2005 (2)
Z2.1, Z2.2, Z2.3, Z2.4, Z2.5, Z3.1, Z3.2, Z3.3, Z3.4, Z3.5 (4), Z3.6, Z4.1: Zonal tournaments
PN: FIDE President nominee

Results

Final match
A fourth game was not played because Xu Yuhua led by two points after game three.
{| class="wikitable" style="text-align:center"
|+Women's World Chess Championship Final 2006
|-
! !! 1 !! 2 !! 3 !! 4 !! Total
|-
| align=left | 
| 0 ||style="background:black; color:white"| ½ || 0 ||rowspan=2|— || ½
|-
| align=left | 
| style="background:black; color:white"| 1 || ½ ||style="background:black; color:white"| 1 || 2½
|}

Bracket

References

External links
ChessBase reports

2006 in chess
Women's World Chess Championships
Chess in Russia
2006 in Russian sport